Anuska Oosterhuis (Enschede, 1978) is a Dutch media artist who lives and works in Rotterdam. She is founder of the Artememes foundation (2007), an art organization that aims to reflect on the position of man in a society dominated by mass media images.

Works of Art 
 2014. PLAY2, flash video game with Internet home videos
 2013. Memetic Manifesto, art manifesto on mass media
 2008. My Favorite Funeral, staged reality show
 2005. PLAY1, flash video game with Internet home videos

Interviews 
Daily Undertaker, My Favorite Funeral, June 18, 2011

External links 
Official website Anuska Oosterhuis

References 

Living people
1978 births
Dutch multimedia artists
Artists from Rotterdam
Dutch women artists